Cnemidochroma buckleyi is a species of beetle in the family Cerambycidae. It was described by Bates in 1879. It is known from Ecuador, Peru, and Bolivia.

References

Callichromatini
Beetles described in 1879
Beetles of South America